Madonna Adoring the Child with Five Angels is a tondo or round painting by the Italian Renaissance master Sandro Botticelli, completed between 1485 and 1490. It is housed in the Baltimore Museum of Art, in Baltimore, Maryland.

This work illustrates the Madonna with a young Jesus accompanied by five angels.

External links
Entry to the panel on the museum's website 

Paintings of the Madonna and Child by Sandro Botticelli
Angels in art

fr:La Madone du Magnificat